Mohammad Kautsar Hikmat (born October 5, 1981), known professionally as Uki Noah, is an Indonesian guitarist who is best known as the rhythm and lead guitarist of the pop band Noah for 19 years.

Early life
He was born in Bandung, West Java, into an educated family. The nickname 'Uki' was given to him by his brother. His father, Hikmat Iskandar, has a Master of Science degree and is a researcher and expert in transportation infrastructure. The family moved to Australia in 1989 and stayed for four years. Uki attended the Bandung Institute of Technology on a scholarship. Uki was also a guest lecturer at the Bandung Institute of Technology.

Uki has been interested in music since junior high school, and taught himself to play guitar. He received a guitar for a gift on his 15th birthday, and his father taught him how to play chords. He also learned a lot from his friend Ariel, who he met in junior high. The two formed a band called Peppermint. After Peppermint, Uki and Ariel formed a band called Sliver and Cholesterol, together Qibil and Erick. The two next joined the group Topi, with Uki playing rhythm. Uki next joined Peterpan (now Noah). He founded his own record label named Masterplan Records and formed his own band, called Astoria. He worked as producer for The Changcuters first album, Mencoba Sukses. He left Noah in August 2019 to pursue Hijrah studies.

Personal life
In 2009, Uki married a soap opera actress, Metha Yunatria. They have one child, and lost a second child shortly after birth, in July 2015.

Filmography

Book
 Kisah Lainnya (2012)
 6.903 mil – Cerita Dibalik Konser 5 Benua 5 Negara (2013)

Awards and nominations

External links

External links
 
 
Profil Uki Noah
Kisah Lainnya, Buku Perjalanan Band Ariel, Uki, Reza, Lukman, David
Liburan Uki Noah Ajak Keluarga Kecilnya Ke Amerika Serikat
  Profil Uki Noah di situs Kapanlagi 

Indonesian musicians
Sundanese people
People from Bandung
1981 births
Living people
Noah (band) members